is a small Japanese automobile company. It is noted for building unique cars with unconventional styling, some of which are modern while others imitate the look of American, European and particularly British retro cars of the 1950s and 1960s. Mitsuoka Motors is also the principal distributor of the retro-classic TD2000 roadster in Japan.

Mitsuoka is primarily a custom design coachbuilder, customizing production cars, e.g., the Nissan March, and replacing various aspects of the bodywork. It has also produced a sports car, the Orochi.

History
Mitsuoka was recognised in 1996 as the 10th Japanese auto manufacturer to be registered in Japan since Honda in 1963, basing its current cars on Nissans and other Japanese car manufacturers.

Mitsuoka Motor launched in the UK in 2015 under sole distribution of T W White & Sons and launched the Mitsuoka Roadster (Himiko) at the London Motor Show in 2016.

Models

Current lineup
1993–present Viewt 
1996–present Galue 
2008–present Himiko/Roadster
2010–present Like-T3
2014–present Ryugi (based on the Toyota Corolla Axio and Toyota Corolla Fielder)
2021–present Buddy (K5 Blazer inspiration based on the Toyota RAV4)

Past vehicles

1982 BUBU 50 Series
 1982 BUBU 501 (a three-wheeled microcar)
 1985 BUBU 505-C (a Morgan 4/4 inspiration)
1989-1990 BUBU 356 Speedstar (a replica of the Porsche 356 Speedster)
1987-1989 BUBU Classic SSK (replica of the Mercedes-Benz SSK roadster based on the Volkswagen Beetle)
2008-2012 Galue 204 (based on the Toyota Corolla Axio)
2010-2012 Galue Classic (based on the Toyota Corolla Axio)
1991-1993 Dore (similar to the Le-Seyde, based on the Nissan Silvia S13)
1990-1993, 2000-2001 Le-Seyde (a Nissan Silvia-based coupé inspired by Zimmer)
2010-2012 Like (based on the Mitsubishi i-MiEV)
1998-2007 Mitsuoka Microcar
1998-2007 Microcar K-1/MC-1
1999-2007 MC-1T
1998-? Microcar K-2 (based on the design of the FMR Tg500)
2005-? Microcar K-3/Type F (design similar to the Zero1)
2006-? Microcar K-4/Type R (styling reminiscent of 1950s race cars)
1999-2007 ME-1
2002-2007 ME-2 (Convoy 88)
2004-2012 Nouera (based on the Honda Accord and later the Toyota Corolla)
2007-2014 Orochi (based on the Honda NSX)
1996-2004 Ray (styling similar to the Riley Elf Mk.3, based on the Mazda Carol and later the Daihatsu Mira Gino)
2018–2022 Rock Star (C2 Corvette inspiration based on the Mazda MX-5)
1998-2004 Ryoga a "classically" styled sedan originally based on the Primera and later on the smaller Sunny
1996-2000 Type F (a restyled Zero1)
2000-2001 Yuga (a London Taxi replica based on the Nissan Cube)
1994-2000 Zero1 (a Lotus Super Seven replica with Eunos Roadster drivetrain)

References

External links

 Mitsuoka Motors Japanese website (Japanese)
 Mitsuoka Motors UK website (English)
 Mitsuoka Motors global website (English)

Companies based in Toyama Prefecture
Vehicle manufacturing companies established in 1968
Lotus Seven replicas
 
Car manufacturers of Japan
Sports car manufacturers
Luxury motor vehicle manufacturers
Japanese brands
Japanese companies established in 1968